The Belozerka culture or Belozerskaya culture was a Late Bronze Age archaeological culture of the later (12th–10th centuries BCE) which replaced the Srubnaya culture on the steppes of Ukraine and Moldova. There are finds near the lower Don and in Kuban and Crimea. It was identified as an independent archaeological culture in the 1980s.

The remains consist of settlements, graves, workshops, treasures, and scattered other finds. The settlements consist of pit-houses, semi–pit-houses, and houses on flat ground with stone foundations, while the graves are tumuli and grave fields. The dead were buried on a wooden floor in a rectangular pit in the fetal position, usually lying on one side, with the head oriented toward the south. Grave goods consisted of one or two wooden vessels, rarely metallic objects.

The culture is associated with the Cimmerians, and it was replaced by the Belogrudov culture and later the Scythians.

References

Archaeological cultures of Eastern Europe
Bronze Age cultures of Europe
Archaeological cultures in Ukraine
Iranian archaeological cultures
Cimmerians